Moods is an album by jazz group The Three Sounds released in 1961 on the Blue Note label. It was recorded the same day Feelin' Good was recorded.

Reception

The Allmusic review by Stephen Thomas Erlewine awarded the album 4 stars stating "The Three Sounds open their signature sound a bit on the romantic Moods. They retain the same light touch that made their early albums so enjoyable, but they add more textures to the mix... on the whole, Moods is an endearing collection of appealing mainstream jazz".

Track listing
 "Love for Sale" (Porter) - 6:37
 "Things Ain't What They Used to Be" (Mercer Ellington) - 8:54
 "On Green Dolphin Street" (Bronisław Kaper, Ned Washington) - 5:37
 "Loose Walk" (Sonny Stitt) - 4:55
 "Li'l Darlin'" (Neal Hefti) - 4:52
 "I'm Beginning to See the Light" (Ellington, George, Hodges, James) - 2:29
 "Tammy's Breeze" (Gene Harris) - 4:28
 "Sandu" (Clifford Brown) - 4:21

Personnel
Gene Harris - piano
Andrew Simpkins - bass
Bill Dowdy - drums

References

Blue Note Records albums
The Three Sounds albums
1961 albums
Albums produced by Alfred Lion
Albums recorded at Van Gelder Studio